Under the Weather is a Canadian drama film, directed by William D. MacGillivray and released in 2020. The film stars Stephen Oates as Joe, a man dying of cancer, who returns home to Newfoundland and Labrador to reconnect with and be taken care of by his family.

The film's cast also includes Ruth Lawrence as Joe's sister Jenny, Des Walsh as Jenny's husband Phil, and Julia Sarah Stone as Phil and Jenny's daughter Maggie, as well as Tom Dunne, Colin Harris, Paula Morgan, Sabrina Roberts, Bridget Wareham and Paul Ewan Wilson in supporting roles.

The film premiered at the 2020 FIN Atlantic Film Festival, although due to the COVID-19 pandemic it was streamed exclusively online. It had its first in-person theatrical screening at the 2022 International Film Festival of Ottawa.

It was a nominee for Best Picture at the 2021 Screen Nova Scotia awards.

References

External links
 

2020 films
2020 drama films
Canadian drama films
English-language Canadian films
2020s Canadian films
Films shot in Newfoundland and Labrador
Films set in Newfoundland and Labrador
Films about cancer
Films directed by William D. MacGillivray